The Battle of Castlebar occurred on 27 August 1798 near the town of Castlebar, County Mayo, during the Irish Rising of that year. A combined force of 2,000 French troops and Irish patriots routed a combined force of 6,000-strong British and Protestant loyalist militia troops led by Gerard Lake, 1st Viscount Lake in what would later become known as the "Castlebar Races" or "Races of Castlebar".

Background
The long-awaited French landing to assist the Irish revolution begun by Theobald Wolfe Tone's Society of United Irishmen had taken place five days earlier on 22 August, when almost 1,100 troops under the command of General Jean Joseph Amable Humbert landed at Cill Chuimín Strand, County Mayo. Although the force was small, the remote location ensured an unopposed landing away from the tens of thousands of British soldiers concentrated in the east in Leinster, engaged in mopping-up operations against remaining pockets of insurgents there. The nearby town of Killala was quickly captured after a brief resistance by local yeomen.  Just south, Ballina was taken two days later following the rout of a force of cavalry sent from the town to oppose the Franco-Irish march. Following the news of the French landing, Irish volunteers began to trickle into the French camp from all over Mayo.

The Lord Lieutenant of Ireland, Lord Cornwallis, requested urgent reinforcements from England but in the interim all available forces were concentrated at Castlebar under the command of General Gerard Lake, the victor of the Battle of Vinegar Hill. The build-up of the British forces at Castlebar had reached 6,000 militia soldiers with dozens of artillery pieces and huge caches of supplies by dawn of 27 August.

Preparations
Leaving about 200 French regulars behind in Killala to cover his rear and line of withdrawal, Humbert took a combined force of about 2,000 French and Irish on 26 August to march on and take Castlebar. The obvious nature of his objective presented the reinforced British there with the apparent advantage of being able to deploy their forces to face a head-on attack from the Ballina road and their forces and artillery were accordingly arranged.  However, locals advised the French of an alternative route to Castlebar through the wilds along the west of Lough Conn, which the British thought impassable for a modern army with attendant artillery train. This route was successfully taken and when Lake's scouts spotted the approaching enemy, the surprised British had to hurriedly change the deployment of their entire force to face the threat from this unanticipated direction.

During the French march on Castlebar, the tenant at Gore castle, James Cuff put up a rear guard action. The castle was strategically placed along the river Deel, close to the road to Crossmolonia and Castlebar. The castle was originally skirmished with Irish peasants and militia. After a sustained attack French columns were sent in for a frontal assault, the door of the castle was breached and the castle subsequently fell. The few defenders were put to the bayonet. James Cuff and his family escaped the estate, but were not able to warn the British forces at Castlebar of the flanking manoeuvre. The estate house was significantly damaged, many if not all the items which had not been taken to England prior to the invasion were taken, the main stairway was also burnt down leaving the house incredibly damaged but not destroyed.

James Cuff would go on to join with the British forces at the battle of Castlebar, giving rearguard defence allowing many troops to escape capture by the French. Mr Cuff would also take part in the arrests of Irish peasantry and had many convicted and hanged for their part in the rebellion.

Battle

Attack

The British had barely completed their new deployment when the Franco-Irish army appeared outside the town at about 6 a.m. The newly sited British artillery opened up on the advancing French and Irish and cut them down in droves. French officers, however, quickly identified an area of scrub and undergrowth in a defile facing the centre of the artillery line which interfered with, and provided some cover from the British line of fire. The French launched a bayonet charge, the ferocity and determination of which unnerved the units stationed behind the artillery. The British units began to waver before the French reached their lines and eventually turned in panic and fled the battlefield, abandoning the gunners and artillery.  Some soldiers of the Longford and Kilkenny militias ran to join the republicans and even joined in the fighting against their former comrades. A unit of cavalry and British regular infantry attempted to stand and stem the tide of panic but were quickly overwhelmed..

British retreat
In the headlong flight of thousands of British soldiers, large quantities of guns and equipment were abandoned, among which was General Lake's personal luggage. Although not pursued a mile or two beyond Castlebar, the British did not stop until reaching Tuam, with some units fleeing as far as Athlone in the panic. The panic was such that only the arrival of Cornwallis at Athlone prevented further flight across the Shannon.

Although achieving a spectacular victory, the losses of the French and Irish were high, losing about 150 men, mostly to the cannonade at the start of the battle. The British suffered over 350 casualties of which about 80 were killed, the rest either wounded or captured, including perhaps 150 who joined the republicans. Following the victory, thousands of volunteers flocked to join the militia who also sent a request to France for reinforcements and formally declared a Republic of Connacht.

Aftermath 
On 31 August, the rebels proclaimed a "Republic of Connaught" – which lasted 12 days before being retaken. On 5 September, the British forces were again defeated at Collooney but, after that, the rebellion quickly unfolded. More troops gathered and by the Battle of Ballinamuck on 8 September, their strength was over 15,000. Ballinamuck was the end for the French general, Humbert, who handed in his surrender. The Irish rebels fought on briefly until scattered; 200 were captured and 500 killed.
Killala was re-taken on 12 September. More French warships sailed for Ireland, but were decisively defeated by the Royal Navy near Tory Island. With that the 1798 rebellion ended. The captured French soldiers were transferred to England and eventually repatriated. The French officers of Irish origin were hanged in Dublin with the Irish rebels.

References

Bibliography 
 
 
 
 

Conflicts in 1798
1798 in Ireland
Battles of the Irish Rebellion of 1798
History of County Mayo
Castlebar
1798 French campaign in Ireland